Cousteau may refer to:
Cousteau (band), a British band
Jacques Cousteau Island or Cerralvo Island, a Mexican Island of the Baja California Sur
Cousteau Rupes, an escarpment on Pluto
Cousteau, the fictional captain's yacht on the USS Enterprise-E in Star Trek

People with the surname
Alexandra Cousteau (born 1976), daughter of Philippe Cousteau Sr.
Ashlan Gorse Cousteau, Philippe Cousteau Jr.'s wife
Céline Cousteau (born 1972), daughter of Jean-Michel Cousteau
Desireé Cousteau, pornographic actress
Fabien Cousteau (born 1967), son of Jean-Michel Cousteau
Jacques-Yves Cousteau (1910–1997), French marine explorer who invented the aqua-lung and pioneered marine conservation
Jan Cousteau, Philippe Cousteau's wife
Jean-Michel Cousteau (born 1938), eldest son of Jacques-Yves Cousteau
Philippe Cousteau (aka Philippe Cousteau Sr.) (1940–1979), second son of Jacques-Yves Cousteau
Philippe Cousteau Jr. (born 1980), son of Philippe Cousteau Sr.
Pierre-Antoine Cousteau (1906–1958), French far-right polemicist and journalist, and brother of Jacques-Yves Cousteau
Simone Melchior Cousteau, Jacques-Yves Cousteau's wife

French-language surnames